The 2011 Season is the 99th season of competitive soccer in the United States.

National teams 

The home team or the team that is designated as the home team is listed in the left column; the away team is in the right column.

Men

Senior

Under-20

Under-18

Under-17

Women

Senior

Friendlies

2011 Four Nations Tournament

2011 Algarve Cup

2011 FIFA Women's World Cup

Under-23

Under-20

Under-18

Under-17

Managerial changes

League tables

Men

Major League Soccer

Playoffs

MLS Cup

North American Soccer League

Playoffs

Finals

USL Pro

American Division

National Division

Playoffs

Final

Premier Development League

Women

Women's Professional Soccer

Women's Major League Soccer

Lamar Hunt U.S. Open Cup

Home teams listed on top of bracket.  (AET): At Extra Time

Final

Honors

Professional

Amateur

American clubs in international competitions

Columbus Crew

Real Salt Lake

Colorado Rapids

FC Dallas

Los Angeles Galaxy

Seattle Sounders

References 

 
Seasons in American soccer